The Chibagalakh (Çıbağalaax) is a river in the Republic of Sakha in Russia. It is a left hand tributary of the Indigirka.

Grayling, whitefish and lenok are found in the waters of the river.

Course 
The Chibagalakh River begins at the confluence of the Tabanda-Seene (Табанда-Сээнэ) and Kanelibit rivers in the Chibagalakh Range of the Chersky Range. It heads roughly eastwards through a valley located between the Chemalgin Range on the northern side and the Chibagalakh Range on the southern. Finally it joins the left bank of the Indigirka  from its mouth.

The river usually freezes in early October and stays frozen until late May or early June. Lake Tabanda's outflow is a right hand tributary of the river.

See also
List of rivers of Russia

References

External links
Озеро Табанда (Lake Tabanda)
Meteorological stations and hydrological gauges within the study basins

Rivers of the Sakha Republic